John Michael Emms (born 14 March 1967) is a chess player who has earned the rank of Grandmaster. This English player was the 2002 captain of the English Olympiad team. He tied for first in the 1997 British Championship.  In October 2004, he also coached a woman's team in the 36th Chess Olympiad in Calvià, Majorca.  He is also a prolific chess author.

Books

 Reissued by Gambit in 2008,

References

External links
Everyman Chess
John Emms Games

1967 births
Living people
English chess players
Chess grandmasters
Chess Olympiad competitors
Chess coaches
National team coaches
English non-fiction writers
British chess writers
English male non-fiction writers